Best of the Doobies, Vol. II is a compilation album by the Doobie Brothers released in November 1981. The album was released with ten tracks, all of them singles from albums released before 1981. The album peaked at No. 39 on the Billboard Top LPs chart and was certified Gold by the RIAA.

Track listing
 "Little Darling (I Need You)" (Holland-Dozier-Holland)
 "Echoes of Love" (Patrick Simmons, Willie Mitchell, Earl Randle)
 "You Belong to Me" (Michael McDonald, Carly Simon)
 "One Step Closer" (Keith Knudsen, John McFee, Carlene Carter)
 "What a Fool Believes" (McDonald, Kenny Loggins)
 "Dependin' on You" (Simmons, McDonald)
 "Here to Love You" (McDonald)
 "One By One" (McDonald, Bobby LaKind)
 "Real Love" (McDonald, Patrick Henderson)
 "Minute by Minute" (McDonald, Lester Abrams)

Personnel
Michael McDonald – vocals, keyboards
Patrick Simmons – guitars, backing vocals, lead vocals (2,6,8)
Keith Knudsen – drums, backing vocals
Tiran Porter – bass guitar, backing vocals
Jeff Baxter – guitars (all tracks except 4,8,9)
John Hartman – drums (all tracks except 4,8,9)
Cornelius Bumpus – sax, keyboards, vocals (4,8,9), lead vocal (4)
John McFee – guitar, vocals (4,8,9)
Chet McCracken – drums (4,8,9)

Additional personnel
Herb Pederson – banjo
Byron Berline – violin
Norton Buffalo – harmonica
Jeff Gilkinson – sitar
Andrew Love – saxophone
Ben Cauley – trumpet
Bill Payne – synthesizer

Charts

Certifications

References

The Doobie Brothers compilation albums
Warner Records compilation albums
Albums produced by Ted Templeman